Agios Spyridonas is a village and a community of the Dio-Olympos municipality. Before the 2011 local government reform it was part of the municipality of Dion, of which it was a municipal district. The 2011 census recorded 1,489 inhabitants in the village. The community of Agios Spyridonas covers an area of 13.52 km2.

History
Agios Spyridonas was founded in the end of the 19th century by Aromanians (Vlachs) from Samarina. They are all Orthodox Christians. In the 20th Sarakatsani settled in the village and, shortly afterwards, in 1955 the village was recognised as an independent community. The church of the village, dedicated to Saint Spyridon, was built in 1915.

Economy
The main occupations of Agios Spyridonas' residents are agriculture (mainly tobacco) and animal husbandry.

See also
List of settlements in the Pieria regional unit

References

Populated places in Pieria (regional unit)
Aromanian settlements in Greece